The following is a list of mayors of McHenry, Illinois

References

McHenry
Mayors